Hsi Hseng Township (also spelt Hsihseng) is a township of Taunggyi District in the Shan State of Myanmar. The principal town is Hsi Hseng.

Towns and villages

References

 
Townships of Shan State